Sinustrombus sinuatus, common name the laciniate conch, is a species of sea snail, a marine gastropod mollusc in the true conch family, Strombidae. It is native to the tropical Indo-Pacific region.

Description
The shell of S. sinuatus is thick and solid with a large body whorl. The short spire consists of about twelve whorls; the exterior of the shell is white, blotched or spotted with yellow, orange or light tan, and the interior is brown, purple or pink. It is rather varied in morphology, with the lip of the aperture having a number of blunt finger-like processes, which vary from being almost unnoticeable to being prominent. The difference in shape of these variations is larger than the difference between the shape of this mollusc and the related species Lambis millepeda, Lambis scorpius and Lambis lambis, which it resembles.

Distribution and habitat
Sinustrombus sinuatus is found in tropical and sub-tropical waters in southeastern Asia and Oceania. Its range extends from Sri Lanka and the eastern coast of India to the Philippines, Japan, Taiwan, Indonesia, Melanesia, Papua New Guinea and northern Australia. Its typical habitat is a sandy substrate with algae and coral fragments in areas with low turbidity.

Ecology
In the nineteenth century there was a widespread belief that members of the family Strombidiae were carnivorous but this proved to be false. S. sinuatus inhabits soft substrates where it feeds on fragments of algae, ingesting sand and detritus, and deriving its nutrition from the decomposing organic material. It is an active mollusc, able to use its slender foot and robust operculum to flip itself off the seabed, in locomotion or defence. Its operculum and the finger-like processes on the lip of the shell are also used in the behaviour involved in shell-righting.

References

External links
 
 

Strombidae
Molluscs of the Indian Ocean
Molluscs of the Pacific Ocean
Gastropods described in 1786